The 1976 New York Giants season was the franchise's 52nd season in the National Football League. The Giants had a 3–11 record in 1976 and finished last in the five-team NFC East.

The season was highlighted by the opening of the new Giants Stadium at the New Jersey Meadowlands in East Rutherford on October 10. In the first game at the stadium, after four road games to open the season, the defending NFC champion Dallas Cowboys handed New York a 24–14 loss. The Giants then suffered defeats against the Minnesota Vikings and Pittsburgh Steelers, falling to 0–7 after week 7. At this time, they fired third-year head coach Bill Arnsparger, whose Giants teams had lost 28 times in 35 games. John McVay was named the team's interim coach, although director of operations Andy Robustelli said the appointment was "not strictly" on a temporary basis.

New York lost its first two games under McVay, against the Philadelphia Eagles and Cowboys. The Giants' first win at Giants Stadium came on November 14, when they defeated the Washington Redskins 12–9; it was their first victory of the season after nine consecutive losses and the first over a George Allen-coached team in 15 tries. In their final four games, they won twice. Linebacker Brad Van Pelt became the first Giant to receive a Pro Bowl invitation since 1972. Following the season, McVay was retained as head coach, signing a two-year contract.

For the 1976 season and now based in New Jersey, the Giants debuted their new helmet design, changing from a stylized “NY” to the word “GIANTS”, underlined in block letters. They wore these exact helmets through the 1979 season; in 1980, the helmet's white stripes were eliminated. These helmets remained unchanged through 1999.

Roster

Schedule 

Note: Intra-division opponents are in bold text.

Standings

References

Bibliography 
 
 

New York Giants seasons
New York Giants
New York Giants season
20th century in East Rutherford, New Jersey
Meadowlands Sports Complex